"Do Your Thing" is a song written by Charles Wright and performed by Charles Wright & the Watts 103rd Street Rhythm Band. It reached #11 on the Billboard Hot 100 and #12 on the R&B chart in 1969.  The song was featured on their 1968 album, Together.

The song was produced by Wright and Fred Smith.

The single ranked #47 on Billboard's Year-End Hot 100 singles of 1969.

Other versions
Mel Brown released a version of the song on his 1970 album, I'd Rather Suck My Thumb.
Ohio Players released a version of the song on their 1981 album, Ouch!
King Tee sampled the song on his 1990 album, At Your Own Risk on the song "Do Your Thing".
Hexstatic released a mix version of the song on their 2002 album, Listen & Learn.

In popular culture
The song was included in the 1997 film Boogie Nights.
The political podcast Chapo Trap House used the song prominently in their first post-election episode of 2016.
UFC fighter Joseph Benavidez uses the song as his walkout music.

References

1968 songs
1968 singles
Charles Wright & the Watts 103rd Street Rhythm Band songs
Ohio Players songs
Warner Records singles